The following is a timeline of the history of the city of Mannheim, Germany.

Prior to 19th century

 1606 -  (fortification) construction begins.
 1607 - Mannheim granted town privileges by Frederick IV, Elector Palatine.
 1660 - Synagogue built.(de)
 1688 - Manheim taken by French forces during the Nine Years' War.
 1689 - Fire.
1701 - Almshouse (predecessor of university hospital mannheim) founded
 1706 -  founded.
 1720 - Residence of Charles III Philip, Elector Palatine relocated to Mannheim from Heidelberg.
 1729 - Population: 15,760.(de)
 1731 - Mannheim Palace Church built.
 1756 - Jesuit Church, Mannheim built.
 1759 - Mannheim Palace completed.
 1766 - Population: 24,190.(de)
 1771 - Town Hall built.
 1774 - Mannheim Observatory tower built.
 1775 - Deutsche Gesellschaft in Mannheim active.
 1779
  (arsenal) built.
 Mannheim National Theatre founded.
 1782 - 13 January: Premiere of Schiller's play The Robbers.
 1788 - Palais Bretzenheim built.
 1794 - French in power.
 1795
 Mannheim besieged during the Campaigns of 1795 in the French Revolutionary Wars.
 Austrians in power.

19th century
 1803 - Mannheim becomes part of the Electorate of Baden.
 1806 - Mannheim becomes part of the Grand Duchy of Baden.
 1819 - March: Writer August von Kotzebue assassinated.
 1828 - Mannheim Harbour opens on the Rhine river.
 1837 -  newspaper begins publication.
 1840 - Heidelberg-Mannheim railway begins operating.
 1849 - Political unrest during the Baden Revolution.
 1855 -  (synagogue) built.
 1859 - Heinrich Lanz AG machinery manufactory in business.
 1876 - Mannheim Hauptbahnhof (train station) built.
 1880 - Population: 53,465.
 1891 -  active.
 1895 -  becomes part of Mannheim.
 1896 - Population: 94,160.(de)
 1897 - Käfertal becomes part of Mannheim.
 1899 -  becomes part of Mannheim.
 1900 - Population: 141,131.

20th century

1900s-1940s
 1905 - Population: 162,607.
 1907
 Industriehafen Mannheim (harbour) opens on the Neckar river.
  (city archives) established.
 Kunsthalle Mannheim (exhibit hall) built.
 SV Waldhof Mannheim (sport club) formed.
 Population: 173,424.(de)
 1910 -  becomes part of Mannheim.
 1911
  (church) built.
 Population: 200,285.(de)
 1912 -  built.
 1913 -  and Sandhofen become part of Mannheim.
 1914 -  (choir) formed.
 1919 - Population: 229,576.
1924 - Mannheim Hospital (now University Hospital Mannheim) opened on the banks of the river Neckar
 1925 - "" art exhibition held.
 1926 - Airfield established at Neuostheim.
 1929 -  becomes part of Mannheim.
 1930
 Population: 271,833.(de)
 1938
 November: Kristallnacht pogrom against Jews.
  (district) formed.
 Eisstadion am Friedrichspark (ice rink) built.
 1940 - Bombing of Mannheim in World War II begins.
 1945 - July: United States Coleman Army Airfield begins operating.
 1946 -  newspaper begins publication.
 1947 - United States military Benjamin Franklin Village established.
 1949 -  office established.

1950s-1990s
 1955 -  Free Voters established.
 1957 - National Theatre Mannheim rebuilt.
 1959 - Rhine Bridge rebuilt.
 1961 - Population: 313,890.(de)
 1967 - University of Mannheim established.
 1970
  (courthouse) built.
 Population: 332,378.(de)
 1972 -  (bridge) opens.
 1975
 Fernmeldeturm Mannheim (communication tower) erected.
 National  (garden show) held in Mannheim.
 1979 - Odeon cinema opens.
 1991
  (city hall) built.
 Mannheim–Stuttgart high-speed railway begins operating.
 1992 - Revised federal electoral districts  and  formed.
 1994
 5 December: Aircraft crashes into the Fernmeldeturm.
 Carl-Benz-Stadion (stadium) opens.
 1995 - Yavuz Sultan Selim Mosque built.

21st century

 2002 - Revised federal Mannheim (electoral district) formed.
 2003
 Popakademie Baden-Württemberg (music school) established.
 2004 -  (business office) opens.
 2005 - SAP Arena opens.
 2007 - Peter Kurz becomes mayor.
 2010 - Population: 313,174.(de)
 2011 -  closes.
 2014 - 25 May:  held.(de)

See also
 
 
 History of Baden-Württemberg state
 History of Baden territory (in German)
Other cities in the state of Baden-Württemberg:(de)
 Timeline of Stuttgart

References

This article incorporates information from the German Wikipedia.

Bibliography

in English
 
 
 
 

in German
 
 
  1901-
 
 
 
  2007-2009 (3 vols)

External links

 Items related to Mannheim, various dates (via Europeana)
 Items related to Mannheim, various dates (via Digital Public Library of America)

Mannheim